Ballarat East (initially spelt Ballaarat East) was an electoral district of the Legislative Assembly in the Australian state of Victoria. Prior to its abolition, it was a 3,323 km² part-urban and part-rural electorate covering areas to the east of the regional centre of Ballarat. It included the Ballarat suburbs of Ballarat East, Bakery Hill, Golden Point, Eureka, Canadian, Mount Pleasant, Mount Clear, Mount Helen and Warrenheip, and the rural towns of Ballan, Buninyong, Bungaree, Creswick, Daylesford, Dunnstown, Hepburn Springs, Kyneton, Lal Lal, Malmsbury, Meredith and Steiglitz. The electorate had a population of 54,127 as of the 2006 census, with 40,578 enrolled electors at the 2010 state election.

Ballarat East was one of the earliest districts of the Legislative Assembly, having been created for the second Assembly election in 1859. It was initially a two-member seat, and as with the rest of the Assembly, was largely non-partisan until 1889, when it became a one-member electorate and began to be held by more partisan figures. It was held by successive early liberal parties until they merged into the Nationalist Party of Australia in the late 1910s, but fell to the Labor Party in 1924, one term before being abolished in 1927. It was recreated as a marginal seat in 1992, when it was won by Liberal Barry Traynor, but was regained for Labor by Geoff Howard when the party won office at the 1999 election. Howard was re-elected at the 2002 election, 2006 election and 2010 election.

Ballarat East was abolished in 2014 after a redistribution of Victoria's electoral boundaries, with much of its territory going to the new district of Buninyong.

Members for Ballarat East

McAdam went on to represent the new Electoral district of Ballarat from 1927.

Election results

References

 District profile from the Victorian Electoral Commission
 District map from the Victorian Electoral Commission (PDF)

Ballarat
Former electoral districts of Victoria (Australia)
1859 establishments in Australia
1927 disestablishments in Australia
1992 establishments in Australia
2014 disestablishments in Australia